Rowan Anthony Liburd (born 28 August 1992) is a footballer who plays as a forward for Ramsgate. Born in England, he represents Saint Kitts and Nevis internationally.

Career

College
Liburd spent four years at Thomas University in Thomasville, Georgia on a football scholarship, where he won several awards including the Sun Conference Player of the Year.

Club
Upon returning to the UK, Liburd signed for Isthmian League side Billericay Town. In July 2015, Liburd signed a two-year contract with Championship side Reading after he had impressed scoring a brace in a 7–0 friendly win over Beaconsfield SYCOB during pre-season.

Liburd made his debut, for Reading in their 2–0 Championship defeat away to Cardiff City on 7 November 2015, coming on as a 63rd-minute substitute for Ola John.

On 4 March 2016, Liburd joined Wycombe Wanderers on an initial one-month loan deal. He made his debut for Wycombe against Newport County in Wycombe's 1–0 defeat on 5 March 2015, almost scoring the equalizer. Liburd's loan was extended until the end of the season on 7 April.

On 4 July 2016, Liburd joined Stevenage for an undisclosed fee. He scored his first goals for Stevenage when he scored twice in an EFL Trophy tie against Southend United on 8 November 2016.

On 31 January 2017, he joined Leyton Orient on loan until the end of the season. Prior to subsequent loans with Hemel Hempstead Town and Guiseley. In December 2017, Guiseley signed Liburd permanently.

Liburd signed for National League North club Hereford on 28 March 2019.

On 14 December 2019, Liburd joined Dartford on an initial month's loan.

After being released by Hereford, Liburd signed for National League South club Welling United on 13 September 2020.

Liburd signed for Isthmian Premier League side Cheshunt on loan from Billericay Town in November 2021. He made his debut for the club on 20th November 2021 in a 2-1 victory away to eventual Champions Worthing. He scored both of the goals. After scoring 14 goals in 15 games, Cheshunt purchased Liburd from Billericay for an undisclosed fee on 27th February 2022, after his loan move expired. He scored on his debut on the same day, at home to Kingstonian. Liburd scored 19 goals across all competitions for Cheshunt during the 21/22 season, helping them win the Hertfordshire Senior Cup for the first time in their history and promotion via the playoffs to the National League South.

On 20 January 2023, Liburd signed for Isthmian League South East Division lleaders Ramsgate for an undisclosed fee.

International career
On 23 March 2019, he was called up to the Saint Kitts and Nevis team for the CONCACAF Nations League qualifying game against Suriname in which he started.

Career statistics

International goals
Scores and results list French Guiana's goal tally first.

References

External links

1992 births
Living people
Footballers from Croydon
English footballers
Association football forwards
Billericay Town F.C. players
Thamesmead Town F.C. players
Reading F.C. players
Wycombe Wanderers F.C. players
Stevenage F.C. players
Leyton Orient F.C. players
Hemel Hempstead Town F.C. players
Guiseley A.F.C. players
Hereford F.C. players
Dartford F.C. players
Welling United F.C. players
Cheshunt F.C. players
Ramsgate F.C. players
Isthmian League players
English Football League players
National League (English football) players
Thomas University alumni
Saint Kitts and Nevis international footballers
Saint Kitts and Nevis footballers
English sportspeople of Saint Kitts and Nevis descent
Black British sportspeople